Agee is a 1980 American documentary film about the writer and film critic James Agee directed and produced by Ross Spears. It was nominated for an Academy Award for Best Documentary Feature.

Cast
 James Agee - Himself (archive footage)
 Mia Agee - Herself
 Mae Burroughs - Herself
 Jimmy Carter - Himself
 Walker Evans - Himself (voice)
 Robert Fitzgerald - Himself
 James Flye - Himself
 John Huston - Himself
 Dwight Macdonald - Himself
 Earl McCarroll - James Agee (voice)
 Alma Neuman - Herself
 Robert Saudek - Himself
 Elizabeth Tingle - Herself
 Olivia Wood - Herself

Reception and accolades
Agee was well received by critics and the film community to the point of receiving a nomination for Best Documentary Feature at the 53rd Academy Awards and winning the Blue Ribbon Award at the American Film Festival.

See also
Life Itself-2014 documentary film by Steve James about Pulitzer Prize-winning film critic Roger Ebert
Classical Hollywood cinema
1980 in film

References

External links

AllMovie

1980 films
1980 documentary films
American documentary films
American black-and-white films
American independent films
Documentary films about writers
1980 independent films
1980s English-language films
1980s American films